Mason Elliott Phelps (December 7, 1885 – September 2, 1945) was an American golfer who competed in the 1904 Summer Olympics. In 1904, Phelps was part of the American team which won the gold medal. He finished 15th in this competition. In the individual competition, he finished sixth in the qualification and was eliminated in the quarter-finals of the match play.

Phelps won the 1908 and 1910 Western Amateur.

References

External links
 Profile

American male golfers
Amateur golfers
Golfers at the 1904 Summer Olympics
Olympic gold medalists for the United States in golf
Medalists at the 1904 Summer Olympics
1885 births
1945 deaths